Shearing Pinx are a Canadian experimental, punk rock band from Vancouver, British Columbia. Formed in 2005, the band is made up of Nic Hughes (vocals/guitar), Isabel Ford (vocals/bass) and Jeremy Van Wyck (drums).

The band has over 50 releases including vinyl records, cassettes and CDs, most of which are distributed through Hughes' own record label, Isolated Now Waves.

The band is often associated with The Emergency Room venue in Vancouver and were featured in an article about Vancouver's "Weird Punk Scene" in the Canadian Music Newspaper Exclaim!.

Discography

Albums

Split Cassettes

Compilations

References

External links
 Shearing Pinx Myspace

Canadian punk rock groups
Musical groups established in 2005
Musical groups from Vancouver
2005 establishments in British Columbia